Walter Will Bankhead (July 21, 1897 – November 24, 1988) was a U.S. Representative from Alabama.

Early life
Walter Will Bankhead was born on July 21, 1897 in Jasper, Alabama. Bankhead attended the public schools.  He was the son of John Hollis Bankhead II, grandson of John H. Bankhead, nephew of William Brockman Bankhead, and cousin of Tallulah Bankhead.

He was graduated from Marion Military Institute in 1916, from the University of Alabama at Tuscaloosa in 1919, and from the law department of the University of Alabama School of Law in 1920. He was admitted to the bar in 1920 and commenced practice in Jasper.

Career
Bankhead served as delegate to the 1940 Democratic National Convention in Chicago. Bankhead was elected as a Democrat to the Seventy-seventh Congress and served from January 3 to February 1, 1941, when he resigned.

He then resumed the practice of law. He served as chairman of the board of Bankhead Mining Co., Inc., and Bankhead Development Co., Inc.. He served as president of Mammoth Packing Co. and Bankhead Broadcasting Co., Inc. He served as vice chairman of the board of directors, First National Bank of Jasper.

Personal life
Bankhead had two daughters, and one son, Blossom, Barbara, and John Hollis Bankhead III.

Death
Bankhead died at his home in Jasper on November 24, 1988. He was interred at Oak Hill Cemetery in Jasper.

References

External links

1897 births
1988 deaths
People from Jasper, Alabama
University of Alabama alumni
University of Alabama School of Law alumni
Bankhead family
American people of Scotch-Irish descent
Democratic Party members of the United States House of Representatives from Alabama